The Muncher is a video game for the Commodore 64 and ZX Spectrum that was released in 1988. It was produced by Beam Software and released by Gremlin Graphics in 1988. The game involves the monster from Chewits attacking various buildings and people.

Gameplay
The objective is to cause as much destruction as possible in a 2D setting town. Points are awarded for various buildings destroyed. The monster has fire breath and can destroy buildings in this way.

Reception

Legacy
The game was issued on the Commodore Format magazine as a full version game in December 1992.

References

External links
 
 The Muncher at lemon64
 

1988 video games
Commodore 64 games
Video games developed in Australia
ZX Spectrum games
Advergames
Kaiju video games
Video games about food and drink